Millipede burns are a cutaneous condition caused by certain millipedes that secrete a toxic liquid that causes a brownish pigmentation and/or burns when it comes into contact with the skin. Some millipedes produce quinones in their defensive secretions, which have been reported to cause brown staining of the skin.

See also 
 Centipede bite
 Skin lesion

References

External links 

Parasitic infestations, stings, and bites of the skin
Arthropod attacks